Psamathocrita dalmatinella is a moth of the family Gelechiidae. It was described by Peter Huemer and Zdenko Tokár in 2000. It is found in Croatia.

The wingspan is 11-11.9 mm. The forewings vary from dull yellowish white to ochreous, with the apical area somewhat darker without markings. The hindwings are shining grey. Adults have been recorded on wing from May to June.

The larvae possibly feed on Achillea holosericea.

References

Moths described in 2000
Psamathocrita